Syed Mohammad Altaf Bukhari (born 1958) is an Indian politician from Jammu and Kashmir and the president of the Jammu and Kashmir Apni Party. He was a member in the Jammu and Kashmir Legislative Assembly, from the Amira Kadal Assembly constituency, for the Jammu and Kashmir Peoples Democratic Party. Bukhari was the elected education minister and later given additional charge of the finance. Almost a year after being expelled from PDP, he formed his own party called Jammu and Kashmir Apni Party on 8 March 2020.

References

Living people
Jammu and Kashmir Peoples Democratic Party politicians
Kashmiri people
Jammu and Kashmir MLAs 2014–2018
Apni Party politicians
1958 births
Indian people of Kashmiri descent